Kelsey Piper is an American journalist who is a staff writer at Vox, where she writes for the column Future Perfect, which covers a variety of topics from an effective altruism perspective. While attending Stanford University, she founded and ran the Stanford Effective Altruism student organization. Piper blogs at The Unit of Caring.

Education and career
Around 2010, while in high school, Piper developed an interest in the rationalist and effective altruism movements. She later studied at Stanford University, where she majored in Symbolic Systems. At Stanford she became a member of Giving What We Can, pledging to donate 30% of her lifetime income to charity, as well as founding the student organization Stanford Effective Altruism. After graduating from Stanford in 2016, Piper worked as the head of the writing team at Triplebyte, until she left to join Vox as a staff writer.

Future Perfect
Since 2018, Piper has written for the Vox column Future Perfect, which covers "the most critical issues of the day through the lens of effective altruism". Piper is concerned about global catastrophic risks, and treats journalism as a way to popularize these risks and advance the cause of addressing them, which is part of effective altruism's broader concern regarding the relevance of immediate action. Specifically, Piper has discussed the possibility that society is living on a historical precipice, where immediate action needs to be taken to avoid global catastrophic risks, and what implications that has for effective altruism and her own journalism.

Piper was an early responder to the COVID-19 pandemic, discussing the risk of a serious global pandemic in February 2020 and recommending measures such as mask-wearing and social distancing in March of the same year. Since then, she has discussed the societal risk posed by inaccurate study preprints and analyzed the impact of the pandemic on the historical scale, deeming it one of the ten deadliest in human history.

References

External links
 Kelsey Piper - Piper's Vox profile
 The Unit of Caring - Piper's blog
Kelsey Piper: Future Perfect — a year of coverage
Can journalists still write about important things? - 80,000 Hours podcast
Kelsey Piper on "Big picture journalism: covering the topics that matter in the long run" - Rationally Speaking podcast
Kelsey Piper, Vox: Effective Altruist News, Memetic Immunity, Questions Social Justice Can Answer - The Rhys Show podcast

Year of birth missing (living people)
Living people
21st-century American journalists
American women bloggers
American women columnists
People from California
Stanford University alumni
Vox (website) people
Women humanitarians
American bloggers
American columnists
American humanitarians
21st-century American women
People associated with effective altruism